Hortense is a French feminine given name that comes from Latin meaning gardener.  It may refer to:

Persons
 Hortense Allart (1801–1879), Italian-French feminist writer and essayist
 Hortense de Beauharnais (1783–1837), stepdaughter of Napoleon and Queen consort of Holland
 Hortense Béwouda (born 1978), sprinter from Cameroon
 Hortense Clews (1926–2006), member of the Belgian Resistance in World War II
 Hortense Dufour (born 1946), French writer
 Hortense Ellis (1941–2000), Jamaican reggae singer
 Hortense Calisher (1911–2009), American fiction writer, author of In the Absence of Angels
 Hortense Gabel (1912–1990), New York Supreme Court Justice 
 Hortense Globensky-Prévost (1804–1873), Canadian heroine 
 Hortense Gordon (1886–1961), Canadian abstract painter
 Hortense Haudebourt-Lescot (1784–1845), French painter of genre scenes
 Hortense or Nicole-Reine Lepaute (1723–1788), French astronomer and mathematician
 Hortense Mancini (1646–1699), Duchess of Mazarin and a mistress of Charles II, King of England
 Hortense Powdermaker (1900–1970), American anthropologist
 Hortense Parker (1859–1938), music teacher and daughter of African–American inventor, industrialist and abolitionist John Parker
 Hortense Rhéa (1844–1899), French actress
 Hortense Schneider (1833–1920), French soprano
 Hortense Sparks Ward (1872–1944), pioneering Texas lawyer and women's rights activist
 Hortense Spillers (born 1942), American literary critic and theorist of Black studies

Fictional characters
 Hortense Bellacourt, the unattractive eldest of the Bellacourt sisters in the Another Period tv series 
 Hortense Briggs, in the novel An American Tragedy by Theodore Dreiser
 Hortense Cumberbatch, in the film Secrets & Lies by British director, Mike Leigh
 Hortense Daigle, portrayed by Eileen Heckart in The Bad Seed play and film
 Hortense Derry, as Frank Derry’s Dana Andrews step-mother, portrayed by Gladys George in the film The Best Years of Our Lives
 Hortense McDuck, a Disney character who is Scrooge McDuck's sister and Donald Duck's mother
 Hortense, adopted sister of Michael Roberts in the novel "Small Island" by Andrea Levy
 Hortense Toomey Campanati, in the novel Earthly Powers by Anthony Burgess
 Mademoiselle Hortense, in the novel Bleak House by Charles Dickens
 Hortense, later known as Mist, from the Guardians of Ga'Hoole series by Kathryn Lasky
 Hortense, Donald Duck's pet in comic books and a cartoon – see Donald's Ostrich
 Hortense, Sapphire's sister in the TV show Amos 'n' Andy.
 Hortense, another Disney character who was the horse of young Scrooge McDuck and was named after Scrooge's sister 
 Hortense, brothel madam in the TV show Maison Close

Feminine given names
French feminine given names